The Archaeological Museum of Argostoli, also known as the Kefalonia Museum is a museum in Argostoli, Greece, located a few blocks south of the central square, across the Municipal Theater on R. Vergoti St..

The old museum was destroyed by an earthquake in 1953. The current building was built in 1960 and designed by the well-known architect Patroklos Karantinos.

The museum also features many other items of pottery and jewelry from excavations around the island and Melissani Lake. It also contains some 3rd-century BC tombstones, a  2nd-century BC mosaic from the temple of Poseidon and archived photographs of an 1899 excavation at Sami.

Closed
After heavy earthquake damage since Jan 2014 the museum remains officially closed. https://web.archive.org/web/20121117114909/http://odysseus.culture.gr/h/4/eh41.jsp?obj_id=3618

References

Argostoli
Buildings and structures completed in 1960
Argostoli
Museums in the Ionian Islands (region)